Ketlin Tekkel (born 20 December 1996) is an Estonian female  BMX rider, representing her nation at international competitions. She competed in the time trial event and race event at the 2015 UCI BMX World Championships.

References

External links
 
 

1996 births
Living people
BMX riders
Estonian female cyclists
European Games competitors for Estonia
Cyclists at the 2015 European Games
Place of birth missing (living people)